The 2014–15 Ethiopian Premier League is the 69th season of top-tier football in Ethiopia. The season began play on 25 October 2014. Saint George SC are the defending champions, having won their 23rd championship.

The league comprises 14 teams, the bottom two of which will be relegated to the National League for 2015–16.

Teams
A total of 14 teams will contest the league, including 12 sides from the 2013–14 season and two promoted from the National League. The two newcomers are Welayta Dicha and Dashen Beer FC.

Weha Serawoch and Adama City F.C. were the last two teams of the 2013–14 season and play in the National League for the 2014–15 season. Saint George SC are the defending champions from the 2013–14 season.

League table

References

Premier League
Premier League
Ethiopian Premier League
Ethiopian Premier League